Shahil Momin (born 25 January 1991) is a German cricketer. He was named in Germany's squad for the 2017 ICC World Cricket League Division Five tournament in South Africa. He played in Germany's opening fixture, against Ghana, on 3 September 2017. He has also played for the Austria cricket team, making his Twenty20 International (T20I) debut for the team on 24 July 2021, against Belgium.

References

External links
 

1991 births
Living people
German cricketers
Austrian cricketers
Austria Twenty20 International cricketers
Place of birth missing (living people)